Paul Lasike (born 18 June 1990) is a New Zealand professional rugby union player for the Harlequins in the English Premiership and also with the Utah Warriors of Major League Rugby (MLR). In American football, he played as a fullback in the National Football League (NFL). In international rugby, he plays for the United States national rugby union team. He played college football and rugby at Brigham Young University.

Early life
Lasike is one of 10 children in an ethnic Tongan family. He served a mission for The Church of Jesus Christ of Latter-day Saints in Alabama. Lasike is married to Ani, a native of Santos, Brazil. Ani's family moved to Sacramento, California when she was in her early teens.

NFL career

Arizona Cardinals 
Lasike was signed as an undrafted free agent by the Arizona Cardinals on 5 May 2015, but was waived on 5 September 2015.

Chicago Bears 
Lasike was signed to the Chicago Bears' practice squad on 7 September 2015, but his contract was terminated the next day due to visa problems. On 21 September 2015, Lasike was re-signed to the Bears' practice squad. On 4 January 2016, Lasike signed a futures contract with the Bears. On 20 September 2016, he was released by the Bears. Two days later he was signed to the practice squad. He was elevated to the active roster on 5 October 2016. He was released by the Bears on 20 October 2016, but the Bears then re-signed him to their practice squad the following day. He was promoted to the active roster on 12 November 2016. On 11 May 2017, he was waived by the Bears.

Rugby union
Lasike first came to BYU on a scholarship to play college rugby. He was called into the United States national rugby union team for the 2018 Americas Rugby Championship, earning his debut against Chile.

Lasike first started playing for Utah Warriors during the inaugural 2018 Major League Rugby season. On 3 August 2018, Lasike travelled to England to join Harlequins in the Gallagher Premiership from the 2018–19 season.

References

External links
BYU Cougars Bio
Arizona Cardinals Bio
Chicago Bears Bio
 

1990 births
Living people
American football fullbacks
Arizona Cardinals players
BYU Cougars football players
Chicago Bears players
New Zealand expatriates in the United States
New Zealand Latter Day Saints
New Zealand Mormon missionaries
New Zealand players of American football
People educated at the Church College of New Zealand
New Zealand sportspeople of Tongan descent
Rugby union players from Auckland
Rugby union centres
Utah Warriors players
Harlequin F.C. players
London Scottish F.C. players
21st-century Mormon missionaries
Rugby union players that played in the NFL
United States international rugby union players